Bartolomé Ramírez (15-16?) was a Spanish military man, who was one of the neighbors of Buenos Aires, who were commissioned to make a request to the King of Spain about the desperate state of the settlers.

Biography 
Born in Spain?. In 1583, Ramirez arrived in Buenos Aires, and almost twenty years later   in 1602, he received land grants in the Río de las Conchas, was dedicated to managing his small ranch.

Bartolomé Ramírez was married to Ana Rodriguez, (who arrived in Buenos Aires with the expedition of Alonso de Vera).

References

External links 
gutenberg.org

16th-century explorers
Explorers of Argentina
People from Buenos Aires